Bernhard Sekles (20 June 1872 – 8 December 1934) was a German composer, conductor, pianist and pedagogue.

Life and career
Bernhard Sekles was born in Frankfurt am Main, the son of Maximilian Seckeles and Anna (née Bischheim). The family name Seckeles was changed by Bernhard Sekles to Sekles. From 1894 to 1895 he was the third Kapellmeister at the Stadttheater in Mainz. In 1896 he became a teacher at the Hoch'sche Konservatorium in Frankfurt am Main; here he started the first jazz class anywhere in 1928. He was the director of the Hoch'sche Konservatorium from 1923 to 1933. For his composition students,  He was one of the first German Jewish academics to lose his job when Hitler came to power in Germany. He died in his native Frankfurt am Main.

Selected compositions

Publishers: Schott, Eulenberg, Leukart, Brockhaus, Oehler, Rather.

Stage works 

 Der Zwerg und die Infantin, (The Birthday of the Infanta), ballet, op. 22, 1913, based on an Oscar Wilde fairy tale
 Scheherazade, opera, op. 26, 1917
 Die Hochzeit des Faun, comic opera, 1921
 Die zehn Küsse, comic opera, 1926

Orchestra 

 Aus den Gärten der Semiramis, symphonic poem, op. 19
 Kleine Suite, dem Andenken E. T. A. Hoffmanns, op. 21
 Die Temperamente, 4 symphonic movements for large orchestra, op. 29, 1916
 Passacaglia und Fuge for large orchestra and organ, op. 17, 1922
 Gesichte, miniatures for small orchestra, op. 29, 1923
 Der Dybuk, prelude for orchestra, op. 35, 1928
 Symphony N° 1, op. 37, 1930

Chamber music 

 Trio for clarinet, violoncello and piano, op. 9
 Skizzen for piano, op. 10
 Serenade for 11 solo instruments, op. 14, 1907
 Divertimento for string quartet, op. 20, 1911
 Passacaglia und Fuge im vierfachen Kontrapunkt for string quartet, op. 23, 1914
 Sonate in d-moll" for violoncello and piano, op. 28, 1919
 String Quartet, op. 31, 1923
 Suite Nr. 1 for piano, op. 34
 Der Musik-Baukasten for piano (3 or 4 hands), 1930
 Chaconne über ein achttaktiges Marschthema (Chaconne on an Eight-Beat March Theme) for viola and piano, op. 38, 1931
 Sonata for violin and piano, op. 44

 Vocal music 

 "Lieder", op. 6
 Volkspoesien aus dem Rumänischen, for baritone and piano, op. 7, 1900
 Aus >Hafis<, 4 songs for baritone and piano, op.11, 1902
 Aus dem Schi-King (Friedrich Rückert), 18 Lieder for high voice and piano, op. 15, 1907
 4 Lieder auf Gedichte von Friedrich Rückert for baritone and piano, op. 18, 1911
 4 Lieder for female choir and piano, op. 6, 1899
 6 volkstümliche Gesänge for soprano, male choir and piano, op. 12, 1904
 Variationen über >Prinz Eugen< for male choir, wind and percussion instruments, op. 32, 1926
 Vater Noah for male choir, op. 36
 Psalm 137 for mixed choir, soprano and organ, 1933/1934 (Edited by Edmund Brownless - Laurentius-Musikverlag)

 Theoretical publications 

 Musikdiktat, dictation exercises, Mainz 1901
 Instrumentations-Beispiele, examples of instrumentation, Mainz 1912
 Musikalische Geduldspiele – Elementarschule der Improvisation, Mainz 1931
 Grundzüge der Formenlehre (rules of harmony)
 Harmonielehre (manual of harmony)

Students

See also
Timeline of jazz education
Jazz in Germany

Literature
Articles in Die Musik in Geschichte und Gegenwart (Kassel 2006) and New Grove (London 2001)
Peter Cahn: Das Hoch'sche Konservatorium 1878-1978, Frankfurt am Main: Kramer, 1979, pages 257-270, 295-297.
Joachim Tschiedel: Der "jüdische Scheindirektor" Bernhard Sekles und die Gründung der ersten europäischen Jazz-Klasse 1928, in: mr-Mitteilungen Nr. 20 - September 1996 
Joachim Tschiedel: Bernhard Sekles 1872 - 1934. Leben und Werk des Frankfurter Komponisten und Pädagogen, Schneverdingen 2005
Theodor W. Adorno: Bernhard Sekles zum 50. Geburtstag, in Gesammelte Schriften Band 18, Frankfurt/Main 1984, S. 269 f.
Theodor W. Adorno: Minima Moralia'', Frankfurt/M. 1951, page 291 ff.
Baker's Biographical Dictionary of Musicians, (Nicolas Slonimsky, Editor) New York: G. Schirmer, 1958

Selected discography
 Chamber Music: Rhapsody, Sonata op. 44, Sonata op. 28, Capriccio; Zuk Records 334, 2011.

References

External links
academic paper including some info on Sekles

1872 births
1934 deaths
German opera composers
Male opera composers
German conductors (music)
German male conductors (music)
19th-century German Jews
Academic staff of Hoch Conservatory
Jewish classical musicians
Musicians from Frankfurt
German male classical composers
Pupils of Iwan Knorr